Warbirds may refer to:

 Warbird, any vintage military aircraft now operated by civilian organizations and individuals or historic arms of military forces
 Warbirds (video game), a 1991 computer game for the Atari Lynx
 WarBirds, a 1995 online computer game by Interactive Creations
 Warbirds (EP), a 2009 EP by This Is Hell
 Romulan Warbird, a class of ship in the Star Trek universe
 Seattle Warbirds, a team in the Women's Football Alliance